Carson Cole (born 1965) is a Canadian folk singer, and lyricist. He is a graduate of Prairie College.

Biography
Cole was born and raised in rural Alberta, Canada. At age 15 he released his first album, Cure for the World, through Canadian Gospel label Praise Records. Cole was married at 22 and subsequently has had three children, shortly after being married he began doing bar gigs and touring with local talent to help support his family. Since then Cole has toured, extensively, Canada, the US and more recently Korea. Cole recently operated his own independent recording studio and label, Brownsound productions, which has seen the development or startup for scores of local and some widely popular bands and musicians. Currently Cole is signed with Dig It All Records, a relatively new Canadian label, and has struck a permanent promotional deal with Hype Publicity of Edmonton, Alberta.

Music
Cole's music has its roots in Gospel and Blues. His first releases would be considered mainstream Gospel music at the time with hints of Blues and Rock influence. Coming into his own with his more recent albums, Cole's music could be considered Alternative Rock with notable Blues and Gospel Funk influence. Cole's range of talent is wide having played almost every genre of music from Industrial to Country. Cole's instrument of choice is the electric guitar, however he is known for playing almost any instrument that can make noise and experimenting with new and unusual instruments in some of his music.

Discography
1980: Cure for the World
1982: The Disguise (Frontline) 
1986: Mainstreet (Frontline, produced by Terry Scott Taylor)
1995: Stop It, I Like I
1998: Thermostat
2000: Naked
2002: Sticky 
2004: Free Ride
2006: Essentials (compilation)
2006: Kickstart

References

External links

1966 births
Living people
Canadian folk singer-songwriters
Canadian male singer-songwriters
Musicians from Alberta